An album by the band  Rehab containing live and acoustic versions of previously released material and a few previously unreleased tracks.

Track listing

References

Rehab (band) albums
2008 live albums